S. N. Wolbach (c.  1851 - September 9, 1931) was an American businessman, banker and politician. He founded a store in Grand Island, Nebraska in 1874, and it later became a large department store in central Nebraska. He was the president of the First National Bank there from 1882 to 1884. He served as a member of the Nebraska House of Representatives for Hall County, Nebraska in 1885 and the Nebraska Senate twice. According to the Lincoln Journal Star, he was "one of the most progressive and substantial citizens of Nebraska, and contributed in various ways to its progress."

References

External links
Samuel N. Wolbach on Find a Grave

1931 deaths
People from Grand Island, Nebraska
Businesspeople from Nebraska
American bank presidents
Members of the Nebraska House of Representatives
Nebraska state senators
Year of birth uncertain